David Camara (born 23 September 1976 in Paris) is a French former professional football player. Currently, he plays in the Championnat National for AS Beauvais Oise. He has played in Ligue 2 for Le Mans Union Club 72, AS Beauvais Oise, AS Nancy and FC Rouen.

References

1976 births
Living people
French footballers
Footballers from Paris
Ligue 2 players
Le Mans FC players
AS Beauvais Oise players
AS Nancy Lorraine players
US Sénart-Moissy players
FC Rouen players
Pacy Ménilles RC players
Association football midfielders
R.A.A. Louviéroise players
French expatriate footballers
Expatriate footballers in Belgium
French expatriate sportspeople in Belgium